The Diocese of Mina was a Roman–Berber civitas and Roman Catholic diocese in Mauretania Caesariensis. It is a Catholic Church titular see.

History 

Mina was a civitas of the Roman province of Mauretania Caesariensis. It has been tentatively identified with ruins near Relizane in modern Algeria. While Mina flourished in late antiquity, it did not last long after the Muslim conquest of the Maghreb.

Known bishops
 Cecilio took part in the synod assembled in Carthage in 484 by King Huneric the Vandal, after which the bishop was exiled.  
 Secondino intervened at the Carthaginian Council of 525. 
 Herman Joseph Meysing, 1929–1951  
 Joseph Mark McShea 1951–1962 
 Heinrich Theissing 1963–1988 
 Carlos Arthur Sevilla 1988–1996 
 John 'Oke Afareha 1997–2010 
 Wilfried Theising, auxiliary bishop of Münster 2010–current

References

Roman towns and cities in Mauretania Caesariensis 
Catholic titular sees in Africa
Former Roman Catholic dioceses in Africa
Mina